This is a list of cities who have nicknames after fruits.

Ostensibly, the first was Big Apple, from which the others have been deemed in popular culture. (American)  Note for international cities, these terms are English language exonyms, and may not jibe with locals if referring to a foreign city, but often associated with backpackers, and/or expats and tourists.

Various
 The Big Orange

United States
 The Big Peach - Atlanta
 The Big Guava - Tampa, FL
The Big Tomato - Sacramento, CA
 The Big Apple - New York City

International
 The Big Durian - Jakarta
 The Big Mango - Bangkok
 The Big Mikan - Tokyo
 The Big Coconut - Mumbai
 The Big Lychee - Hong Kong

References

United States
United States Cities